Micah 2 is the second chapter of the Book of Micah in the Hebrew Bible or the Old Testament of the Christian Bible. This book contains the prophecies attributed to the prophet Micah, and is a part of the Book of the Twelve Minor Prophets.

Text
The original text was written in the Hebrew language. This chapter is divided into 13 verses.

Textual versions
Some early manuscripts containing the text of this chapter in Hebrew are of the Masoretic Text tradition, which includes the Codex Cairensis (895), the Petersburg Codex of the Prophets (916), Codex Leningradensis (1008).

Fragments containing parts of this chapter were found among the Dead Sea Scrolls, including 4Q82 (4QXIIg; 25 BCE) with extant verses 3–4; and Wadi Murabba'at Minor Prophets (Mur88; MurXIIProph; 75-100 CE) with extant verses 1‑13.

There is also a translation into Koine Greek known as the Septuagint, made in the last few centuries BCE. Extant ancient manuscripts of the Septuagint version include Codex Vaticanus (B; B; 4th century), Codex Alexandrinus (A; A; 5th century) and Codex Marchalianus (Q; Q; 6th century). Some fragments containing parts of this chapter in Greek were found among the Dead Sea Scrolls, that is, Naḥal Ḥever 8Ḥev1 (8ḤevXIIgr); late 1st century BCE) with extant verses 7–8.

Man proposes, but God disposes (2:1–5)
There is here a perfect balance between 'accusation' (verses 1–2) and 'threat' ('therefore', verses 3, 5): 
 the accused 'devise... evil' (verse 1), but God also does in return (verse 3)
 'they covet fields' (verse 2), but God 'parcels out theirs to others' (verse 4)
 they seize others' 'inheritance' (verse 2) only to 'bewail the loss of their own' (verse 4). 

'They' may refer to 'official administrators' (cf. Micah 3:1, 9) who collected tax from the rural population and sometimes 'to appropriate land and property' (could be as part of Hezekiah's military preparations for the invasion of Sennacherib; cf. Isaiah 22:7–11). For Micah, this exercise of power 'amounts to a breach of the Ten Commandments' (verse 2).

Verse 13

 "The breaker": it is best to interpret "the breaker" of Christ himself; and it is explained by the Jews also, to whom this and all the rest of the characters in the text agree; and who may be so called with respect to his incarnation, being the firstborn that opened the womb, and broke forth into the world in a very extraordinary manner; his birth being of a virgin, who was so both before and after the birth; thus Pharez had his name, which is from the same root, and is of a similar sound with Phorez here, from his breaking forth before his brother, unawares, and contrary to expectation, .
 "The breaker is come (gone) up before them": The redemption of Israel is depicted under the figure of release from captivity, without interpolation into a declaration of the siege and ruin of Samaria or Jerusalem.
But here the object is expressed, to go forth. Plainly then, they were confined before, as in a prison; and the gate of the prison was burst open, to set them free.
 "Their king": refers to "the Breaker".

See also
 Jacob
 Zion
Related Bible parts: Isaiah 30, 1 Corinthians 5

Notes

References

Sources

External links

Jewish
Micah 2 Hebrew with Parallel English
Micah 2 Hebrew with Rashi's Commentary

Christian
Micah 2 English Translation with Parallel Latin Vulgate

02